San Vitores may refer to:

 Diego Luis de San Vitores (1627–1672), a Jesuit missionary martyred on Guam

On Guam 
 Blessed Diego Luis de San Vitores Church, in Tumon, Guam, under the Roman Catholic Archdiocese of Agaña 
 Pale San Vitores Road, a section of Guam Highway 14 in Tumon, Guam
 San Vitores Beach Japanese Fortification, NHRP-listed ruins of Japanese WWII fortifications on Tumon Bay, Guam 
 San Vitores Martyrdom Site, an NHRP-listed site in Tumon, Guam

In Spain 
 Church of San Vitores, a Gothic church built in the 13th and 14th centuries in Frías, Province of Burgos, Spain
 Francisca de San Vítores (17th century), the financier of San Lorenzo el Real, Burgos in Spain
 Los Moros de San Vitores, a cave known for Paleolithic art in Valles Pasiegos, Spain